Rafael Jiménez Jarque (born 12 August 1993), known as Fali, is a Spanish professional footballer who plays for Cádiz CF as either a central defender or a defensive midfielder.

Club career

Levante and Huracán
Born in Valencia, Fali joined Levante UD's youth setup in 2010 at age 17, after starting out at Villarreal CF and Catarroja CF. He made his senior debut with their reserves, spending one season apiece in Segunda División B and Tercera División.

Fali terminated his contract with the Valencians on 16 August 2013, and signed with third-tier club Huracán Valencia CF just hours later. In the 2014–15 campaign he appeared in 42 matches and scored three goals, as the team missed out on promotion in the play-offs.

Gimnàstic
On 6 July 2015, Fali agreed to a two-year deal with Gimnàstic de Tarragona, newly promoted to Segunda División. He played his first game as a professional on 30 August, coming on as a 46th-minute substitute for Sergio Tejera in a 2–1 away win against CD Tenerife.

Fali scored his first goal in the second division on 19 December 2015, his team's second in a 3–1 home victory over Real Zaragoza. On 7 January of the following year, he was loaned to FC Barcelona Atlètic until June.

On 11 July 2016, Fali's loan was extended until 2018 with a buyout clause. He returned to Nàstic in late January 2018.

Cádiz
On 10 May 2019, Fali moved to fellow division two side Cádiz CF on loan until the end of the season, as a replacement to injured Aleksandar Pantić. On 8 July, he signed a permanent three-year deal. 

Fali renewed his contract 10 February 2020, until 2024. He scored once from 30 appearances that season, helping to a return to La Liga after 14 years.

On 20 September 2020, Fali made his debut in the Spanish top flight, playing the second half of the 2–0 away defeat of SD Huesca.

Personal life
Fali is from a gypsy community; he was married at age 16, and had a child at age 17. He worked in a scrapyard.

Career statistics

Club

References

External links

1993 births
Living people
Spanish footballers
Footballers from Valencia (city)
Association football defenders
Association football midfielders
Association football utility players
La Liga players
Segunda División players
Segunda División B players
Tercera División players
Atlético Levante UD players
Huracán Valencia CF players
Gimnàstic de Tarragona footballers
FC Barcelona Atlètic players
Cádiz CF players